Rotăreşti may refer to:

Rotăreşti, a village in Sâmbăta Commune, Bihor County, Romania
Rotăreşti, a village in Talpa Commune, Teleorman County, Romania